Elizabeth Thompson (1846–1933) was a British painter.

Elizabeth Thompson may also refer to:

Betty Thompson (1934–1994), Canadian TV presenter
Eliza Thompson (1816–1905), American Christian campaigner
Elizabeth A. Thompson (born 1949), English-born American statistician
Elizabeth Thompson (field hockey) (born 1994), New Zealand hockey player
Elizabeth Thompson (Barbados) (born 1961), Barbadian politician and diplomat
Elizabeth Maria Bowen Thompson (1812/13–1869), British educator missionary
Elizabeth Thompson (painter) (born 1954), American painter
Elizabeth Rowell Thompson, American philanthropist
Libby Thompson (1855–1953), American prostitute and dancehall girl

See also
Elizabeth Thomson (disambiguation)
Liz Thompson (disambiguation)
Elizabeth Thomson Clark, poet and playwright
Thompson (surname)